Herbert "Bert" Lancashire DuPont (born November 12, 1938 in Toledo, Ohio) is an American physician, medical school professor, and medical researcher, specializing in infectious diseases.

Education and career
DuPont graduated in 1961 from Ohio Wesleyan University with a bachelor's degree and in 1965 from the Emory University School of Medicine with an M.D. At the University of Minnesota Hospitals in Minneapolis, he did his medical internship from 1965 to 1966 and his medical residency from 1966 to 1967. During his medical residency he was supervised by Dr. Wesley W. Spink (1904–1988) and became interested in infectious diseases.

From 1967 to 1969 DuPont held a fellowship at the University of Maryland School of Medicine (UMSOM) in Baltimore. There he also did his military service as Epidemic Intelligence Officer of the Centers of Disease Control (CDC). At UMSOM he became in 1970 an assistant professor and in 1972 an associate professor. In 1973 he became a professor of medicine at the University of Texas Medical School at Houston (now called the McGovern Medical School, part of the University of Texas Health Science Center at Houston), as well as the first director of a newly established department of infectious diseases and medical microbiology. At the McGovern Medical School, he is the director of the Center for Infectious Diseases and since 1988 holds the Mary W. Kelsey Distinguished Chair in the Medical Sciences. Since 1977 he is a professor at Baylor College of Medicine in Houston. Since 1995 he has held a variety of appointments at Baylor St. Luke's Medical Center.

DuPont's research is particularly concerned with diarrheal diseases. In 1971 he was one of the researchers who described the biological properties of the Norwalk virus (later classified as one of the human noroviruses), and in a much-cited 1971 paper in the New England Journal of Medicine, he described the pathogenesis of diarrhea by Escherichia coli. His research also deals with other diarrheal agents such as Shigella, rotaviruses, Salmonella serotype Typhi bacteria, Cryptosporidium parvum, and Giardia. He and his colleagues demonstrated the effectiveness of rifaximin against travelers' diarrhea. In field studies in Mexico, he showed that tap water with viral pathogens, including rotaviruses, was a major source of infection with viral diarrhea.

He is the author or co-author of 17 books and over 500 articles. In 1990 he was the president of the Infectious Diseases Society of America (IDSA). He received in 2007 from the National Foundation for Infectious Diseases the Maxwell Finland Award and in 2010 from the IDSA the Alexander Fleming Award for lifetime achievement.

Family
His older brother Robert DuPont is a psychiatrist who in the 1970s was the director of the National Institute on Drug Abuse.

Herbert DuPont and his wife, Margaret Wright DuPont, are both graduates of Ohio Wesleyan University's class of 1961. She has a master's degree in psychology from the Ohio State University.

They established the Herbert L. and Margaret Wright DuPont Endowed Professorship at Ohio Wesleyan University.

Selected publications
 
 
 
 
  (1st edition, 2003)
  (1st edition, 1999; 2nd edition, 2003)
 
  (1st edition, 1989)

References

American infectious disease physicians
American medical researchers
Physician-scientists
Ohio Wesleyan University alumni
Emory University School of Medicine alumni
University of Texas Health Science Center at Houston faculty
Baylor College of Medicine faculty
1938 births
Living people